Burnupia stuhlmanni is a species of small freshwater snail or limpet, an aquatic gastropod mollusk which was traditionally placed in the family Planorbidae, the ram's horn snails and their allies.

Distribution 
This freshwater limpet is found in Kenya, Tanzania, and Uganda. Its natural habitats are rivers and freshwater lakes.

References

Planorbidae
Taxa named by Eduard von Martens
Gastropods described in 1897
Taxonomy articles created by Polbot